Amelita Ward (July 17, 1923 – April 26, 1987) was an American film actress. She played supporting roles in over 20 films between 1943 and 1949, generally in B Pictures such as Gangway for Tomorrow and The Falcon in Danger (1943). She was sometimes credited as Lita Ward.

Life and career
Ward's father was Claude "Bud" Ward, a production manager for NBC.

Two producers discovered Ward while they were in Harlingen, Texas, filming scenes on location. That led to her first film role, in Aerial Gunner (1943).

Ward married Leo Gorcey on February 10, 1949, in Ensenada, Mexico. They had two children and later divorced in February 1956.

Filmography

References

Bibliography
 Fyne, Robert. Long Ago and Far Away: Hollywood and the Second World War. Scarecrow Press, 2008.

External links

1923 births
1987 deaths
American film actresses
People from Morgan County, West Virginia
Actresses from West Virginia
20th-century American actresses